Konstantinos Tambouratzis (born ) is a Greek male volleyball player. He is part of the Greece men's national volleyball team. On club level he played for Olympiacos.

References

External links
 profile at FIVB.org
 profile at greekvolley.gr

1983 births
Living people
Greek men's volleyball players
Olympiacos S.C. players
Place of birth missing (living people)